Geldrop-Mierlo is a municipality in the southern Netherlands, in the province of North Brabant. The municipality was created from the two former municipalities of Geldrop and Mierlo on 1 January 2004.

Villages
The two villages of Geldrop and Mierlo used to be separate municipalities, but joined together after threats from Helmond to take over Mierlo. Its partner city is Dobříš in the Czech Republic.

Topography

Dutch topographic map of the municipality of Geldrop-Mierlo, June 2015

History
The exact age of Geldrop isn't known. Over the years there have been several archaeological finds relating to prehistoric peoples who lived in or passed through the area. In the area of Geldrop, where over 10,000 years ago reindeerhunters of the so-called Ahrensburg culture placed their tents, two {?} with engravings have been found, among other artefacts.  On one of them a reindeerhorn have been represented, on the other one a dancing little girl, who is called 'venus van Mierlo'. In the south of Zesgehuchten (district of Geldrop) finds have been done which indicate on small settlements from the New Stone Age (round 3000 BC). Finds from the Roman Time and the early Middle Ages have been found off Genoenhuis and Hoog Geldrop (districts in Geldrop). In the autumn of 1989 nearby 't Zand (cemetery) archaeological unearthings has been carried out. These had a remarkable result. Four settlements were found from the late Roman Time and the Middle Ages: a period which covers the years between 350 and 1225.

Transportation 
 Geldrop railway station

Notable residents

 Willem van Enckevoirt (1464 in Mierlo-Hout – 1534 in Rome) a Dutch Cardinal, Bishop of Utrecht 1529 to 1534. 
 Dries van Agt (born 1931 in Geldrop) former Prime Minister of the Netherlands, 1977/1982
 A.F.Th. van der Heijden (born 1951 in Geldrop) a Dutch writer
 Dr. Wijnand van der Sanden (born 1953 in Geldrop) a Dutch archaeologist and prehistorian
 Raimond Lap (born 1959 in Geldrop) a composer of music for toddlers and babies
 Rianne Donders-de Leest (born 1960) a Dutch politician,  Mayor of Geldrop-Mierlo 2004/2015 
 Michiel Riedijk (born 1964 in Geldrop) a Dutch architect and university professor
 Menno Westendorp (born 1969 in Geldrop) a Dutch cinematographer
 Frank Lammers (born 1972 in Mierlo) a Dutch TV and film actor 
 Martijn Deijkers (born 1975 in Geldrop), stage name Martyn, a Dutch producer and DJ
 Job Roggeveen (born 1979 in Geldrop) a film director and writer
 Pieter Henket (born 1979 in Geldrop) a photographer who lives and works in New York City
 Lara Stone (born 1983 in Mierlo) a Dutch fashion model

Sport 

 Ernest Faber (born 1971 in Geldrop) a football manager and former player with 248 club caps
 Dirk Lippits (born 1977 in Geldrop) a Dutch rower, silver medallist in the 2000 Summer Olympics
 Pieter van den Hoogenband (born 1978) a Dutch former swimmer, triple gold medallist at the 2000 and 2004 Summer Olympics, grew up in Geldrop
 Marcel Balkestein (born 1981 in Geldrop) a Dutch field hockey player, team silver medallist at the 2012 Summer Olympics
 Roel Koolen (born 1982 in Mierlo) a Dutch baseball player, competed at the 2008 Summer Olympics
 Mink van der Weerden (born 1988 in Geldrop) a Dutch field hockey player, team silver medallist at the 2012 Summer Olympics
 Maikel van der Vleuten (born 1988 in Geldrop) a Dutch show jumping rider, team silver medallist at the 2012 Summer Olympics 
 Mitch Dielemans (born 1993 in Geldrop) a Dutch competitive archer, competed at the 2016 Summer Olympics

Gallery

References

External links

Official website

 
Municipalities of North Brabant
Municipalities of the Netherlands established in 2004